Hakim Medane (born 5 September 1966) is a former Algerian international football player. He is currently the general manager of National team of Algeria

Club career
Born in El Harrach, Algiers, Medane began his career in the youth ranks of IR Hussein Dey. After two seasons, he joined USM El Harrach where he was promoted to the senior side after one season. In 1987, he helped the club win the Algerian Cup, scoring the only goal in the final against JS Bordj Ménaïel. In 1988, Medane joined JS Kabylie, where he won the league title in his first season. The following season, JS Kabylie repeated the feat and also went on to win the African Cup of Champions Clubs, beating Zambian side Nkana Red Devils in the final.

In 1991, Medane joined Portuguese Primeira Liga side F.C. Famalicão. He spent three seasons with the club and left after they were relegated at the end of the 1993–1994. In 1994, he moved to S.C. Salgueiros with whom he spent just one season before returning to Famalicão. After another season with Famalicão, he returned to Algeria for his second stint with JS Kabylie. In 2000, he captained JS Kabylie to the 2000 CAF Cup title, beating Egyptian side Ismaily in the final. He announced his retirement after the final.

International career
On December 28, 1984, Medane, aged 18 at the time, made his debut for the Algeria national team in a friendly against Ghana.

He represented Algeria at three Africa Cup of Nations tournaments: 1986, 1988 and 1992.

Honours
USM El Harrach
Algerian Cup: 1987

JS Kabylie
Algerian Championnat National: 1989, 1990
African Cup of Champions Clubs: 1990
CAF Cup: 2000

References

External links

1966 births
1986 African Cup of Nations players
1988 African Cup of Nations players
1992 African Cup of Nations players
Algerian footballers
Algerian expatriate footballers
Algeria international footballers
Algeria youth international footballers
Algerian expatriate sportspeople in Portugal
Expatriate footballers in Portugal
F.C. Famalicão players
JS Kabylie players
Kabyle people
Living people
Primeira Liga players
People from El Harrach
S.C. Salgueiros players
USM El Harrach players
Association football midfielders
21st-century Algerian people